Maurquice Bryce Shakir (born October 14, 1993) is a former American football guard. He played college football at Middle Tennessee.

Professional career

Baltimore Ravens
Shakir signed with the Baltimore Ravens as an undrafted free agent on May 5, 2017. He was waived on September 2, 2017 and was signed to the Ravens' practice squad the next day. He was promoted to the active roster on October 31, 2017.

On September 1, 2018, Shakir was waived by the Ravens.

Houston Texans
On December 12, 2018, Shakir was signed to the Houston Texans practice squad. He signed a reserve/future contract on January 7, 2019. 
On August 30, 2019, Shakir was released.

Dallas Renegades
Shakir was drafted in the 3rd round in phase two in the 2020 XFL Draft by the Dallas Renegades. He had his contract terminated when the league suspended operations on April 10, 2020.

References

External links
Middle Tennessee Blue Raiders bio
Baltimore Ravens bio

1993 births
Living people
Players of American football from Los Angeles
American football offensive guards
Middle Tennessee Blue Raiders football players
Baltimore Ravens players
Dallas Renegades players
Houston Texans players